Šarišské Jastrabie is a village and municipality in Stará Ľubovňa District in the Prešov Region of northern Slovakia.

History
In historical records, the village was first mentioned in 1435.
Web pages  Byzantine Catholic Parish of the Dormition of the Mother of God Sarisske Jastrabie

Geography
The municipality lies at an elevation of 565 metres (1,850 ft) and covers an area of 21.390 km² (8.645 mi²). It has a population of about 1170 people.

External links
Šarišské Jastrabie - The Carpathian Connection
http://www.statistics.sk/mosmis/eng/run.html

Villages and municipalities in Stará Ľubovňa District
Šariš